Richard Stokes was  an English Anglican priest in the late 16th and early 17th centuries.

Stokes was  educated at the University of Oxford. He held livings at Bishopsteignton, Bunwell and Banham. he was Archdeacon of Norfolk from 1587 until his death in 1619.

Notes

16th-century English Anglican priests
17th-century English Anglican priests
Archdeacons of Norfolk
Alumni of the University of Oxford